Gwin may refer to:
An animal character in Cornelia Funke's Inkworld trilogy
 Aaron Gwin, American professional downhill mountain biker
 James S. Gwin (born 1954), United States federal judge
 Gwin Town,  a populated place in the county of Grand Gedeh in Liberia 
 Adar Llwch Gwin, giant birds, similar in kind to the griffin, which were given to a warrior named Drudwas ap Tryffin by his fairy wife
 , four ships of this name in the United States Navy 
 Robert Gwin, a Welsh Roman Catholic divine
 William Gwin (disambiguation)

See also
 Gwyn (disambiguation)
 Gwynne (disambiguation)